Operation Cartenz' Peace, formerly Operation Nemangkawi, is a joint-operation conducted by Indonesian National Armed Forces and Indonesian National Police to curb armed separatist rebels in Papua. According to Papua Regional Police head, Mathius Fakhiri, there are currently six active separatist groups located mainly in Papua highlands. While there are two groups which became less active or retired after Operation Nemangkawi. Tinggi Nambut faction under Goliath Tabuni were beaten in October 2018, and 10 members were subdued by Police. Goliath Tabuni moved to Gome District and presumed retired. Lanny Jaya faction under Purom Wenda became less active after Police operation in Balingga District and its headquarters in Kali Mau. Some members of this group left and "return" to Indonesia.

References

Indonesian Army
Cartenzs' Peace
2018 in Indonesia
2019 in Indonesia
2020 in Indonesia
2021 in Indonesia
Cartenzs' Peace